Nikola Spasovski was the sixth director of the Administration for Security and Counterintelligence  of Macedonia.

References

 

Macedonian politicians
Living people
Eastern Orthodox Christians from North Macedonia
Year of birth missing (living people)